Nuria Llagostera Vives and Arantxa Parra Santonja were the defending champions. They were both present but did not compete together.
Llagostera Vives partnered with María José Martínez Sánchez, but Parra Santonja and partner Lourdes Domínguez Lino defeated them 4–6, 7–5, 10–4, in the final.

Seeds

  Nuria Llagostera Vives /  María José Martínez Sánchez (final)
  Andrea Hlaváčková /  Klaudia Jans (semifinals)
  Lourdes Domínguez Lino /  Arantxa Parra Santonja (champions)
  Alicia Molik /  Carla Suárez Navarro (first round)

Draw

Draw

External links
Draw

Doubles